Tom George Longstaff (15 January 1875 – 27 June 1964) was an English medical doctor, explorer and mountaineer, most famous for being the first person to climb a summit of over 7,000 metres in elevation, Trisul, in the India/Pakistan Himalayas in 1907. He also made important explorations and climbs in Tibet, Nepal, the Karakoram, Spitsbergen, Greenland, and Baffin Island. He was president of the (British) Alpine Club from 1947 to 1949 and a founding member of The Alpine Ski Club in 1908.

Early life
Longstaff was the eldest son of Lt-Col. Llewellyn W. Longstaff OBE of Wimbledon, the first and most generous supporter of Captain Scott's National Antarctic Expedition. He was educated at Eton College, Christ Church, Oxford, and St Thomas' Hospital, London.

War service
Longstaff was commissioned into the 1/7th Battalion of the Hampshire Regiment in 1914 and served on the General Staff at Army Headquarters, Simla, 1915–1916. He was Assistant Commandant of the Gilgit Corps of Scouts, Frontier Militia, and Special Assistant at Fort Gupis to the Political Agent in Gilgit, from 1916, and was promoted Captain in 1917, retiring from the service in 1918.

During the Second World War, he served with the 7th and 13th Battalion of the KRRC from 1939 to 1941.

Mountaineer
Longstaff climbed in the Alps, the Caucasus, Himalayas, Selkirk, Rocky Mountains, Greenland, and Spitsbergen.

Before the Great War, he travelled in Tibet in 1905, ascended Trisul in the Himalayas, 1907, and in 1908 was awarded the Gill Memorial by the Royal Geographical Society for his work in the Himalaya and Tibet. He went on to explore the Siachen Glacier and discovered the peaks of Teram Kangri in 1909.

After the war, he took part in an Oxford University Expedition to Spitsbergen in 1921 and was chief medical officer and naturalist on the 1922 British Mount Everest expedition. He returned to Spitsbergen in 1923 and to the Garhwal Himalaya in 1927. He led the Oxford University Expedition to Greenland in 1928 and the same year was awarded the Founder's Medal of the Royal Geographical Society for his work in the Himalaya, especially his discovery of the Siachen Glacier. In Greenland again, 1931 and 1934, and Baffin Island, 1934.

In 1933 he was one of eleven people involved in the appeal that led to the foundation of the British Trust for Ornithology (BTO), an organisation for the study of birds in the British Isles.

He lived at Achiltibuie, in the Highlands of Scotland, where he died at the age of eighty-nine on 27 June 1964.

Notes

References

Longstaff, Tom George in Who's Who 1964.
Eric Shipton, Longstaff, Tom George (1875–1964), rev., Oxford Dictionary of National Biography, Oxford University Press, 2004

External links 
 
 

1875 births
1964 deaths
Royal Hampshire Regiment officers
King's Royal Rifle Corps officers
British Army personnel of World War I
British Army personnel of World War II
Alumni of Christ Church, Oxford
English explorers
English mountain climbers
Baffin Island
People educated at Eton College
Presidents of the Alpine Club (UK)